Shabbat candles are candles lit on Friday evening before sunset to usher in the Jewish Sabbath. Lighting Shabbat candles is a rabbinically mandated law. Candle-lighting is traditionally done by the woman of the household but, in the absence of a woman, it is done by a man. After lighting the candles, the lighter covers their eyes and recites a blessing.

In Yiddish, lighting the candles is known as licht bentschen ("light-blessing") or licht tsinden ("light-kindling").

History

The practice of lighting an oil lamp before Shabbat is first recorded in the second chapter of m. Shabbat. The purpose of lighting of Shabbat candles is to dignify the Sabbath; before the advent of electric lighting, when the alternative was to eat in the dark, it was necessary to light lamps to create an appropriate environment.

The blessing is first attested in a fragment in the St. Petersburg national library (Antonin B, 122, 2) dated to the 2nd century CE; it also appears in a plethora of Gaonic material, including the Seder of Amram Gaon, the responsa of Natronai Gaon, the responsa of Sherira Gaon, and others. Every source quotes it with identical language, exactly correspondent to the modern liturgy.

Ritual

Who lights 
The lighting is preferably done by a woman. Talmudic sources (y. Shabbat 2:6, Gen. Rabb. 17:8, TanhBub Noah 1:1) explain that "the First Man was the world's lamp, but Eve extinguished him. Therefore they gave the commandment of the lamp to the woman". Solomon b. Isaac (b. Shabbat 32a s.v. hareni) adds an additional rationale, "and moreover, she is responsible for household needs." Moses b. Maimon, who rejects Talmudic rationales based on superstition, writes only: "And women are more obligated in this matter than men, because they are found at home and involved in housework."

Number of candles 
Today, most Jews light at least two candles. Authorities up to and including Joseph Karo, who wrote that "there are those who employ two wicks, one corresponding to "Remember" and one corresponding to "Keep" (perhaps two wicks in one lamp, reflecting the Talmudic teaching "'Remember' and 'Keep' in a single statement"), advised a maximum of two lamps, with other lamps necessary for other purposes kept carefully at a distance to preserve the tableau. However, Moses Isserles added "and it's possible to add and light three or four lamps, and such is our custom", and Yisrael Meir Kagan added, "and there are those who light seven candles corresponding to the seven days of the week (Lurianics), or ten corresponding to the Ten Commandments". Starting with Yaakov Levi Moelin, rabbinic authorities have required women who forgot to light one week to add an additional lamp to her regular number for the rest of her life. 

A recent custom reinterprets the two candles as husband and wife and adds a new candle for every child born; apparently the first to hear of it was Israel Hayyim Friedman, though his essay was not published until 1965. Menachem Mendel Schneerson mentioned it in a 1975 letter. Mordechai Leifer supposedly said, "The women light two candles before children but after their first child they light five, corresponding to the Five Books Of Moses . . . and so it is forever, irrespective of how many children" but this teaching was not published until 1988. Menashe Klein offers two interpretations: either it is based on Moelin's rule and women who miss a week because they were giving birth are not exempted (though all other authorities assume they are exempted) or it is based on comparison with Hanukkah candles, which some medieval authorities recommended be lit one per member of the household.

Hand waving 
In the Ashkenazic rite, after the candles are lit, a blessing is said (whereas, in the Sephardic rite, the blessing is said before the lighting). In order to avoid benefiting from the light of the candles before uttering the blessing, Ashkenazic authorities recommend that the lighter cover her eyes for the intervening period. Today, many Jewish women make an exaggerated motion, waving their hands in the air, when covering their eyes; there is no specific source for this in traditional texts.

The Sefer haAsuppot, attributed to the 13th-century scholar Elijah b. Isaac of Carcassonne, records that "I heard that [Rashi's granddaughter] Rabbanit Hannah, the sister of Rabbi Jacob, would  warn the women not to begin the blessing until the second candle was lit, lest the women accept the Sabbath and then continue lighting candles."

Time
The candles must be lit before the official starting time of Shabbat, which varies from place to place, but is generally 18 or 20 minutes before sunset. In some places the customary time is earlier: 30 minutes before sunset in Haifa and 40 minutes in Jerusalem, perhaps because the mountains in those cities obstructed the horizon and once made it difficult to know if sunset had arrived.

Blessing

In the late 20th century, some apparently began to add the word kodesh ("holy") at the end of the blessing, making "... the lamp of holy Shabbat", a practice with no historical antecedent. At least two earlier sources include this version, the Givat Shaul of Saul Abdullah Joseph (Hong Kong, 1906) and the Yafeh laLev of Rahamim Nissim Palacci (Turkey, 1906) but authorities in the major Orthodox traditions were solicited for responsa only in the late 1960s, and each acknowledges it only as a new and alternative practice. Menachem Mendel Schneerson and Moshe Sternbuch endorsed the innovation but most authorities, including Yitzhak Yosef, ruled that it is forbidden, though it does not nullify the blessing if already performed. Almog Levi attributes this addition to misinformed baalot teshuva. It has never been a widespread custom but its popularity, especially within Chabad, continues to grow.

References

Further reading
B.M. Lewin, The History of the Sabbath Candles, in Essays and Studies in Memory of Linda A. Miller, I. Davidson (ed), New York, 1938, pp.55-68.

Shabbat
Laws of Shabbat
Jewish blessings
Jewish ritual objects
Candles